The 1991 Minnesota Golden Gophers football team represented the University of Minnesota in the 1991 NCAA Division I-A football season. In their sixth year under head coach John Gutekunst, the Golden Gophers compiled a 2–9 record and were outscored by their opponents by a combined total of 302 to 104.

Offensive linemen Chip Brixius, defensive back Chris Cohen, wide receiver Omar Douglas, linebacker Dan LiSanti, running back Ken McClintock, defensive back Jeff Rosga and linebacker Lance Wolkow were named Academic All-Big Ten.

Defensive back Sean Lumpkin was awarded the Bronko Nagurski Award and Carl Eller Award.  Tight end Patt Evans was awarded the Bruce Smith Award.  Ken McClintock was awarded the Bobby Bell Award.  Linebacker Joel Staats was awarded the Butch Nash Award.  Quarterback Scott Schaffner was awarded the Paul Giel Award.

Total attendance for the season was 218,219, which averaged out to 36,369 per game.  The season high for attendance was against the San José State.

Schedule

Roster

References

Minnesota
Minnesota Golden Gophers football seasons
Minnesota Golden Gophers football